Karasi Sanjak, (Turkish: Karesi Sancağı ; c. 1341–1922) was one of the first sanjaks of the Ottoman Empire established around 1341 and disestablished after signing the Treaty of Lausanne.

Despite being established in 1341, the Sanjak only existed in name. Not holding any lands, until the Ottoman conquest of the Beylik of Karasi in 1361.

References 

Karasi
1340s establishments in the Ottoman Empire
1923 disestablishments in the Ottoman Empire